Little River Railroad may refer to:

 Little River Railroad (Michigan), a heritage railroad in Coldwater
 Little River Railroad (Tennessee) (1901–1939), a class III railroad between Maryville and Elkmont

See also
 Little River (disambiguation)
 Little River Township (disambiguation)